Peters Brook may refer to the following in the U.S. state of New Jersey:

Peters Brook (Raritan River), a tributary of the Raritan River
Peters Brook (Stony Brook), a tributary of Stony Brook
A variant name of Woodsville Brook, a tributary of Stony Brook

See also
Peters Creek (disambiguation)